E. Paul Palmer (1926–2011) was a Brigham Young University physicist who specialized in geophysics. He coined the term "cold fusion".  However he was an early critic of Fleischmann and Pons's claims to have developed a useful method of cold fusion.

Palmer served in the US Navy during World War II. He later served as a missionary for the Church of Jesus Christ of Latter-day Saints in the East Central States Mission (primarily Tennessee and Kentucky). He received his bachelor's degree in physics from the University of Utah.

Sources
New York Times, April 28, 1989
BYU faculty listing
https://web.archive.org/web/20080506023241/http://pages.csam.montclair.edu/~kowalski/cf/131history.html
http://www.newscientist.com/article/mg12216633.500-science-rocks-reveal-the-signature-of-fusion-at-the-centreof-the-earth-.html
Provo Herald obituary for Palmer

1926 births
2011 deaths
University of Utah alumni
Brigham Young University faculty
American geophysicists
Cold fusion
Latter Day Saints from Utah
American Mormon missionaries in the United States